Shri Mahavir Ji is an important and prominent Jain pilgrimage site situated in Shri Mahaveerji town in Hindaun Block, Karauli district in Rajasthan. Given the importance of the religious place, the Indian Railways has specifically developed a railway station under West Central Railway zone by the name of Shri Mahaveerji railway station which is 10 minutes drive from the temple and temple authorities have arranged for regular buses from the station to the temple. The temple is visited by millions of Jain and Hindu devotees every year.

Main temple 

There are five temples in Shri Mahavirji. Atishaya Kshetra Shri Mahavirji is considered one of the miraculous pilgrimages of Jains. This pilgrimage is situated at banks of Gambhir river in Hindaun Block of Karauli district, Rajasthan. Built at the bank of a river, this pilgrimage is a prominent centre of devotion for Jain devotees. Chandanpur Mahavirji temple is hailed as the heart of pilgrimages. The temple is visited by millions of Jain and Hindu devotees every year.

The temple trust extends various charitable and philanthropic services such as a dispensary, aushadhalaya (pharmacy), school, library, rehabilitation centre, promotion and extension of education, cultural and literary activities, scholarships, and research and study in Prakrit language. The temple also has a naturopathy and yoga centre.

In 2022, Mahamastakabhisheka is being organised here after 24 years and a  statue of Mahavira has been installed here.

History 

The temple was constructed by a Jain merchant, Shri Amar Chand Bilala, in the 17th century upon the discovery of the idol of Mahavira. This is a sacred place of the tradition of Jainism. Mahavirji also had a Bhattaraka seat which became defunct in 1970.

Discovery of the statue 

The main temple contains the statue of the lord Mahavira and along with idols of other Tirthankaras. In this statue lord Mahavira is sitting in padmasana posture.

The iconic idol of Lord Mahavira, the principal deity of the pilgrimage temple, was found during an excavation. It was later found to be more than 1000 years old. A Gurjar dairy farmer named Krapa Ram noticed that one of his cows was always dry of milk. When cow belonging used to pour out its milk every day upon a mound near Chandanpur village. It was surprising for the owner of that cow and the villagers. They excavated the mound and found the idol of lord Mahaveer. The villagers dedicated themselves to building a small hut over the idol where the idol was found. The place is now known as devata-ka tilla or chharan chatri. The news of the miracles idol spread and a Jain merchant, Shri Amar Chand Bilala visited the site and realised that it was a Jain idol. The King of Jaipur tried to execute the merchant but was saved by the miracles of the idol. Shri Amar Chand Bilala constructed a vast & magnificent temple here. 

According to legends, while trying to move the idol on a chariot to the temple constructed a few yards from the excavation site, the chariot did not move. Amar Chand Bilala prayed for the idol to move and the god replied that the chariot will move when Krapa Ram pushes the cart. At the site where the idol was excavated a small shrine chharan chatri with the representation of the footprint of the deity was constructed. The shrine is still managed by the family of Krapa Ram.

Architecture 

The main temple of Shri Mahaverji is a vast & magnificent ornamented structure constructed using marble and red sandstone. The temple exterior plan follows Māru-Gurjara architecture. The temple is built in Nagara architecture.  The structure has oblong and canopied chhatris. Temple has multiple cusped arches that are supported by pillars and the spandrel is decorated with a fringe pattern. The temple has three pinnacles each bearing golden kalasha. This temple is surrounded by Dharmashalas. The premises of Dharmashalas surrounding the temple is called Katla. In the centre of Katla, the main temple is situated. The entrance gate of Katla is very attractive and magnificent.

At the main gate, there comes a rectangular ground and then there are seven gates to enter the Mahamandapa. After entering the temple we found a big shrine before us. An icon of Bhagavān Mahavira resembling the miraculous principal deity and two other icons are installed here. In Garbh Griha (Central Room of Temple), on the main shrine, the miraculous icon of Bhagavān Mahavira in Padmāsana posture, coral-coloured made of sandstone is installed with Bhagavān Pushpadanta in the right side and Bhagavān Ādinātha’s icon in the left side. The temple also enshrines ancient icons of other Tirthankaras.

The exterior & interior walls of the temple are richly decorated with carvings and golden paintings of scenes from Mahavira's and Parshvanatha's life. There are exquisite carvings of 16 mythological scenes on the outer walls of the temple.

In the front of the main gate of the temple stands a 52 feet high marble Manastambha (column of pride). Four Tirthankara icons are installed at the top of Manstambha in all directions.

Other temples

Shantinath Jinalaya
Shantinath Jinalaya (Temple) at Shantiveer Nagar was built in the twentieth century. The main attraction of the temple is an imposing 32 feet high colossus statue of Shantinatha, the 16th Jain tirthankara, in kayotsarga posture. Icons of 24 Tirthankaras and their Shasan Deotas in sub-shrines are also installed here. An attractive sky-high Manastambha is also standing here. The temple features  cells that follows Māru-Gurjara architecture.

Bhagwan Parshvanath Jinalaya
Bhagavān Parshvanatha Jinalaya, also called ‘Kanch Ka Mandir’ due to its mirror and glasswork, is situated in front of Sanmati Dharmashala. This temple was constructed by Late Bramhacharini Kamla Bai. The main idol of this temple is black coloured idol Bhagavān Parshvanatha.

Krishnabai Chaityalaya
Krishnabai chaityalaya was built in the 19th century. The temple features a double arch entrance, the first arch is foliated with a bud pattern & second is a round arch. The temple is a superstructure supported by pillars and canopied chhatri. The temple enshrines an idol of Mahavira in lotus position.

Bhavya Kamal Mandir
The Bhavya Kamal Mandir temple was constructed in the 20th century and is located on the road connecting Shantinath Jinalya and Main Temple. The temple is dedicated to Chandraprabha. The temple features a arched gateway and canopied chhatris.

Annual Fair 
An annual fair is organized in the temple premise around Mahavir Jayanti (April) which attracts Jains and people from many other communities including Meena and Gujjar and religions in a great number. The fair is for five days (starts 2 days prior to Mahavir Jayanti and ends two days post Mahavir Jayanti) and ends with a colourful Rath Yatra pulled by Bullock cart. Many Jain sadhus or monks deliver religious discourses during this fair.

Photo gallery

References

Citations

Sources

Books

Web 

 
 
 
 
 Indira Gandhi National Centre for the Arts

External links

 Devasthan Vibhag, Govt. of Rajasthan

Jain temples in Rajasthan
Tourist attractions in Karauli district
Tourist attractions in Hindaun
Cities and towns in Karauli district
Hindaun Block
17th-century Jain temples
Colossal Jain statues in India